Wesley "Lee" Behel was an American aviator and air racing champion. He was the creator and, at the time of his death the president, of the "Sport Class" a group of racing airplanes designed for planes under 1000 cubic inches in size that participate in the Reno Air Races each year in September, as well as a retired Lt. Colonel in the Nevada Air National Guard.

Behel joined the Nevada Air National Guard in 1972, where he flew several aircraft, including the F-101 Voodoo, the F4 Phantom in which he accumulated 2,500 hours of flight time, as well as the RF-4C reconnaissance aircraft. He retired from the Guard in 1996.

In 2000, he first flew in the AirVenture Cup Race, a cross-country open-circuit air race, with his ten-year-old son Jay on board. He would fly that race fifteen straight years.

On 8 September 2014, Behel perished while flying Sweet Dreams, a custom built one of a kind aircraft that was powered by a Chevrolet small-block engine that had been adapted for use in this specific aircraft.

The crash took place in the north end of the race course when the plane Behel was flying suffered a "catastrophic mechanical failure" at 3:16 p.m. According to witnesses, the aircraft took off and flew to enter the course. Around the 5th outer pylon, in an area of the course known as "High-G Ridge", sections of the right wing broke away from the airplane, which then rolled sharply to the right and impacted the ground.

The crash occurred during a qualifying heat early in the 2014 Reno Air Race program and will be investigated by the NTSB as well as the FAA. Behel was a certified fighter jet pilot who also enjoyed flying high-performance single-engine race planes.   
Behel had once owned Steven's Creek Porsche/Audi in Santa Clara, a business that he had sold in 2012.

In April 2014, Behel had set three class world records in the same aircraft: Speed over a  course, 3 km time-to-climb, and speed over a  course. Additionally, at the time of his death he held the world speed records for the RF-4C in 100 and 500 km closed courses.

References

External links 
 Profile of Lee Behel
 AirVenture Cup Race

2014 deaths
American air racers
American aviation record holders
Aviators killed in aviation accidents or incidents in the United States
Sports deaths in Nevada
Victims of aviation accidents or incidents in 2014